The 1994 J. League Cup, officially the '94 J.League Yamazaki Nabisco Cup, was the 20th edition of Japan soccer league cup tournament and the third edition under the current J. League Cup format. The championship started on July 27, and finished on August 6, 1994.

First round

Quarterfinals

Semifinals

Final

References
Official report 

1994 domestic association football cups
1994
Lea